Superlambanana is a bright yellow sculpture in Liverpool, England. It currently stands in Tithebarn Street, outside the Avril Robarts Library of Liverpool John Moores University, having previously been located on Wapping near the Albert Dock.

Chiezo himself only created a four-inch model, while the full-size replica was made by local artists Andy Small, Julian Taylor, Tommy Reason, and Ray Stokes. Developed for the 1998 ArtTransPennine Exhibition, the sculpture is both a comment on the dangers of genetic engineering and is heavily influenced by the history of Liverpool: historically, both sheep and bananas were common cargos in the city's docks.

In 2008, as part of Liverpool's year-long position as the European Capital of Culture, 125 individual miniature replicas were created. Sponsored by local community organisations and businesses in the city, the mini Superlambananas were located throughout the Liverpool and Merseyside region. One sculpture, The Highest SuperLambBanana, was located on top of Moel Famau, North Wales, recognising the very close links the city has with that region.

Origin
The sculpture was created for the ArtTransPennine Exhibition in 1998, part of an initiative to create a 'corridor of art' through the North of England. Liverpool's contribution, designed by Japanese artist Taro Chiezo, was the Superlambanana which was unveiled to the city at the reopening of Liverpool's branch of the famous Tate Gallery. An ironic comment on the dangers of genetic engineering, it was developed with the city specifically in mind as both the banana and lamb were once a common cargo in Liverpool's bustling docks. The thinking behind Chiezo's Superlambanana was the creation of something that 'spoke of the future of 90's Liverpool'. He had previously visited the city and been inspired by the Queensway Tunnel's ventilation shaft, in particular the symbolism of how a vital piece of 1930's engineering had been incorporated into a broader 'sculpture' (or in this case an aesthetically attractive building). Chiezo himself made only a four-inch model, with four local sculptors: Andy Small, Julian Taylor, Tommy Reason and Ray Stokes, recreating it on a scale of 50:1.

It was created using a wire-mesh frame that supported a concrete and fibreglass shell and was developed at the former Bryant and May Matchworks factory in the south of the City at a total cost of £35,000. The sculpture was at first considered controversial and there was scepticism regarding its purpose and value. However it soon became a popular symbol in the city and a valued piece of public art. At the end of the ArtTransPennine Exhibition, responsibility for the sculpture was handed to the Liverpool Architecture & Design Trust.

Time in the Liverpool area
Since the sculpture's conception it was intended to move around the city and not remain in one location. It was originally located on the Strand near Liverpool's famous Liver Building and has since been located in several places including Williamson Square, Spike Island in Widnes, Cheshire, and on Wapping, close to the Albert Dock. Council leader Warren Bradley also suggested that the sculpture could be moved to Garston in the south of the city in the near future.

Although its usual colour is yellow, the statue has occasionally been given a temporary repaint as part of a sponsorship arrangement. Colours have included pink, during a period of sponsorship by the breast cancer awareness charity Breakthrough, the colours of a Friesian cow during a period of 'quasi-vandalism', and purple during the SmokeFree Liverpool campaign.

After Liverpool
There had been a great deal of speculation about the future of the sculpture after it emerged that it was only on loan to the city council from the artist and it had been suggested that the sculpture could be sold to Liverpool's neighbour Manchester. In September 2008 talks began between the Liverpool Culture Company and representatives of Taro Chiezo about keeping the sculpture in Liverpool.

Six months later, in February 2009, it was announced that an agreement had been reached between the two parties that will see a new replica model being made by original sculptor Julian Taylor that will remain in the city for the next 80 years. It is expected that the current Superlambanana will be returned to Chiezo to be auctioned off.

Go Superlambananas!

As part of Liverpool's Capital of Culture celebrations, 125 two-metre-high replicas of Superlambanana were commissioned and located throughout Liverpool and the surrounding areas. The mini Superlambananas were developed in partnership between the Liverpool Culture Company and Wild in Art, with each one being sponsored by a local institution or business and designed by local community members. The miniature Superlambananas were on display for ten weeks, from the June to August 2008. The Liverpool Echo partnered with the event, releasing a location map and guide of every mini Superlambanana to encourage locals to get involved. All but two of them were located within the Merseyside area. Lovemedoodle was located at Euston railway station in London for a short while until it was moved back to Liverpool Lime Street station, whilst The Highest SuperLambBanana was located on top of Moel Famau in North Wales and was sponsored by Denbighshire County Council.

At the end of their ten-week run, the mini Superlambananas were auctioned off for the Lord Mayor's charities, with each having a guide price ranging from £3,000 to £8,000. The first of two auctions was held at St George's Hall on 9 September 2008 with 68 Superlambananas up for sale. In total they sold for a combined sum of £550,000 or approximately £7,800 each, well above estimates. The highest bid on the night was £25,000, paid by the Chairman of National Museums Liverpool for 'Mandy' Mandala Superlambanana created by glass artist Patricia Lee, whilst Phil Redmond, creative director of the Liverpool Culture Company, purchased four lots for a total of £55,000. Other notable purchasers included comedian John Bishop, playwright Fred Lawless and Big Brother star Craig Phillips.  A second, internet-based auction (hosted by AuctionYourProperty) took place on 16 September 2008 with 25% of the proceeds going to charity.

Superlambananas return

Early in 2010, eight new two-metre-high replicas of Superlambanana, known as the "Eight for 08" were commissioned as a permanent piece of public art. Initially placed on The Strand, in front of the Cunard and Liver Buildings, they were destined to be moved to  Lime Street station following the station's refurbishment.

In 2010, one of these sculptures was sent to the 2010 World Expo in Shanghai, China. This sculpture was named 'Archie' as it featured many designs from architectural details from the city. The sculpture was gifted by the city, and now resides in the Shanghai World Expo Museum. This sculpture was made in the medium of mosaic, and was designed and made by Debbie Ryan, a local artist from the city of Liverpool. 

As of October 2014, four of the 'Eight for 08' have been relocated to the Pier Head, outside the new Museum of Liverpool. Mandy Mandala Superlambanana is in the museum itself.

References

External links

Official Superlambanana website
Official GoSuperlambananas website
GoSuperlambananas Map
BBC - Superlambananas to return to Liverpool March 2010
BBC - Superlambanana donated to museum September 2008

Tourist attractions in Liverpool
Outdoor sculptures in England
1998 sculptures
Concrete sculptures in England
Fiberglass sculptures in the United Kingdom
1998 establishments in England